Solaire Resort & Casino (formerly known as Solaire Manila) is a resort and casino in Entertainment City, a massive complex built along the Bay City area of Parañaque, in Metro Manila, Philippines.

Overview
Solaire Resort & Casino was the first development to break ground in PAGCOR's Entertainment City, a massive integrated resort envisioned by former PAGCOR Chairman Ephraim Genuino for the Manila Bay area. The  reclaimed area was designated as a special economic zone by the Philippine Economic Zone Authority.

The resort is run by Bloomberry Resorts Corporation, headed by Enrique K. Razón, Jr., chairman of the Manila-based company, International Container Terminal Services Incorporated. The project required an investment commitment of $1.2 billion pursuant to a casino license from PAGCOR.

History
After Resorts World Manila was built in August 2009, the state-run Philippine Amusement and Gaming Corporation (PAGCOR) issued a provisional license to Bloomberry Resorts and Hotels Incorporated; the facility was launched as "Solaire Manila", and broke ground in July 2010. The hotel tower was topped out in June 2012 alongside a parking garage.

In October 2012, Solaire Manila was renamed "Solaire Resort & Casino" and Phase 1 was completed in the first quarter of 2013. Leading the official opening of Solaire Resort and Casino were President Benigno Aquino III, Bloomberry Resorts Corporation Chairman and CEO Enrique K. Razon Jr., Chairman of PAGCOR Cristino Naguiat Jr. and other guests, inaugurating the casino resort at 15:00 PST (GMT+8) on March 16, 2013–exactly 492 years after Ferdinand Magellan had arrived in the Philippines.

Development
Bay Tower and Sky Tower features total of 800 rooms, suites and villas. Solaire features a column-free grand ballroom which can accommodate a maximum of 1,300 guests. The Forum features 8 function rooms and 2 boardrooms with audiovisual equipment. The complex includes  gaming area containing 1,620 slot machines and 360 gaming tables. The complex features convention facilities as well as leisure, live entertainment, dining and retail hubs. The project includes a second parking building, and "The Theatre at Solaire", with 1,740 seats and retail space of 60,000 square meters.

Solaire Resort & Casino was managed under a five-year contract by American firm Global Gaming Asset Management, (which owned a 9 percent stake in the project) until September 2013. Solaire's COO Michael French was replaced by former Marina Bay Sands CEO Thomas Arasi.

An arena which is to be part of the casino complex, was planned to be among the proposed venues for the Philippine hosting bid for the 2019 FIBA World Cup.

Solaire Resort & Casino was designed by architect and designer Paul Steelman of Las Vegas-based Steelman Partners with interior design provided by Steelman Partners affiliate company DSAA (Dalton, Steelman, Arias & Associates) and the interior lighting design by affiliate shop12.

See also
 Gambling in Metro Manila

References

External links

 Global Vision Filipino Heart by Ivar Gica 

Casinos completed in 2013
Casinos in Metro Manila
Hotels in Metro Manila
Resorts in the Philippines
Buildings and structures in Parañaque
Tourist attractions in Metro Manila